Yang Anjiang (born August 1945) is a politician of the People's Republic of China. Yang was born in Xupu County, Hunan in 1945. He joined the Chinese Communist Party in 1965, and in 2006 he became the Chairman of the Chinese People's Political Consultative Conference Beijing Committee. Yang was a member of the 16th Central Commission for Discipline Inspection.

External links
 Biography of Yang Anjiang, official website of the CPPCC Beijing Committee.

1945 births
People's Republic of China politicians from Hunan
Living people
Chinese Communist Party politicians from Hunan
Politicians from Huaihua
Political office-holders in Beijing
East China University of Science and Technology alumni